Aglianese Calcio 1923 is an Italian association football club located in Agliana, Tuscany. It currently plays in the Serie D. They are most known for being the first Italian team to have green and black stripes.

External links
 Official homepage (under construction)

Football clubs in Tuscany
Association football clubs established in 1923
Serie C clubs
1923 establishments in Italy